Ahmose-Inhapy or Ahmose-Inhapi (referred to as Anhapou by Maspero) was a princess and queen of the late 17th Dynasty and early 18th Dynasty.

Life
She was probably a daughter of Pharaoh Senakhtenre and was sister to Pharaoh Seqenenre Tao, and the queens Ahhotep and Sitdjehuti. She probably married Seqenenre Tao, but it is possible she dates to the later time of Ahmose I (or even Amenhotep I).

She had a daughter named Ahmose-Henuttamehu. Ahmose Inhapy was mentioned in a copy of the Book of the Dead owned by her daughter Ahmose-Henuttamehu, and in the tomb of Amenemhat (TT53). Her titles were: King's Wife and King's Daughter.

Death and burial
A tomb was made for Inhapy in Thebes; her mummy was later reburied in DB320 where it was discovered in 1881 and is now in the Egyptian Museum in Cairo.

The mummy was found in the outer coffin of Lady Rai, the nurse of Inhapy's niece Queen Ahmose-Nefertari. It was unwrapped by Gaston Maspero on June 26, 1886, and was later examined by Grafton Elliot Smith who described Inhapi as a big, strong-built woman with a strong resemblance to her brother. Smith dates her burial to the later years of the reign of Ahmose I. The mummy had a garland of flowers around its neck. The body was laid out with her arms by her side, and the skin of the mummy was of a dark-brown color. The outer layer of the skin was still present and no evidence of salt was found. This may mean that the body was not immersed in natron as described by Herodotus, Diodorus and others. An incision was made in the left side to allow for the removal of the organs and the cavity may have been treated with natron. The body was sprinkled with aromatic powdered wood and wrapped in resin soaked linen.

References

16th-century BC women
Queens consort of the Eighteenth Dynasty of Egypt
Queens consort of the Seventeenth Dynasty of Egypt
Ancient Egyptian mummies